Amigo's Parlor Shake Shake Shake was the first live-recorded concert of Ami Suzuki. It was released by Sony Music Entertainment Japan in VHS and DVD formats.

Track listing
Love the Island
Be Together
White Key
Silent Stream
Nothing Without You
Alone in My Room
All Night Long
Don't Leave Me Behind
Our Days
Happy New Millennium
Don't Need to Say Good Bye
Thank You 4 Every Day Every Body
I Really Wanna Tell/Multiple Angle Function (8 tunes)

Ami Suzuki live albums
Ami Suzuki video albums
2000 live albums
2000 video albums
Live video albums